Ben Gannon Doak (born 11 November 2005) is a Scottish professional footballer who plays as a winger for English club Liverpool.

Club career
Doak began his career at hometown club Dalry Rovers, before moving to Ayr United and then onto Celtic. On 26 December 2021, having turned 16 the previous month, Doak was named on the bench for Celtic's 3–1 win away to St Johnstone. On 29 January 2022, he made his Celtic debut, coming on as a 68th minute substitute in a 1–0 Scottish Premiership win against Dundee United. 

Doak signed with Liverpool in March 2022, with Celtic due to receive training compensation of around £600,000. On 9 November 2022, Doak made his debut for Liverpool when he came on as a 74th minute substitute in a 3–2 penalty shoot-out win against Derby County in the third round of the 2022–23 EFL Cup at Anfield. Five days later, he signed his first professional contract with Liverpool, having reached the age of 17. Doak made his league debut for Liverpool on 26 December in a 3–1 win at Aston Villa, and became the youngest Scottish player to appear in the Premier League.

International career
On 2 September 2021, after previously representing the under-16s, Doak made his debut for Scotland U17, scoring in a 1–1 draw against Wales. He helped the U17 team qualify for the 2022 UEFA European Under-17 Championship, but missed the tournament due to injury.

Doak was included in the under-21 squad for the first time in September 2022, aged 16. He made his debut as a substitute on 22 September 2022 against Northern Ireland and scored within seven minutes; in doing so, he became the youngest ever goalscorer for the Scotland U21s.

Personal life 
His grandfather Martin Doak was also a footballer, having played for the likes of Greenock Morton (more than 300 appearances across two spells).

Career statistics

References

Footballers from North Ayrshire
2005 births
Living people
Association football fullbacks
Association football wingers
Scotland youth international footballers
Celtic F.C. players
Lowland Football League players
Scottish Professional Football League players
Scottish footballers
People from Dalry, North Ayrshire
Liverpool F.C. players
Scotland under-21 international footballers
Premier League players